Jaroslav Starosta (born 21 April 1937) is a Czech rower who represented Czechoslovakia. He competed at the 1960 Summer Olympics in Rome with the men's coxless four where they came fourth.

References

1937 births
Living people
Czechoslovak male rowers
Olympic rowers of Czechoslovakia
Rowers at the 1960 Summer Olympics
Rowers from Prague
Rowers at the 1964 Summer Olympics
European Rowing Championships medalists